The Ukrainian People's Republic (UPR), or Ukrainian National Republic (UNR), was a country in Eastern Europe that existed between the years 1917 and 1920. The country was first declared following the February Revolution in Russia, by a state political act called the First Universal of the Ukrainian Central Council. In March 1917, the National Congress in Kyiv elected the Central Council of Ukraine, which had been composed of socialist parties that held the same principles as the Russian Republic. The republic's autonomy was recognized by the Russian Provisional Government. Following the October Revolution, the Ukrainian People's Republic proclaimed its independence from the Russian Republic, on 22 January 1918, by the Fourth Universal.

During its short existence, the republic went through several political transformations – from the socialist-leaning republic headed by the Central Council of Ukraine with its general secretariat to the socialist republic led by the Directorate and by Symon Petliura. Between April and December 1918, the socialist authority of the Ukrainian People's Republic was suspended, having been overthrown by the pro-German Ukrainian State of Pavlo Skoropadskyi, who was elected as a Hetman by a congress of peasants. In January 1919 the UNR declared a unification with the West Ukrainian People's Republic. From late 1919, the UNR operated as an ally of the Second Polish Republic. On 10 November 1920, the state lost the remainder of its territory to the Bolsheviks. The 18 March 1921 Peace of Riga between the Second Polish Republic, Soviet Russia (acting also on behalf of Soviet Belarus), and Soviet Ukraine sealed the fate of the Ukrainian People's Republic.

After the October Revolution, many governments formed in Ukraine, most notably the Ukrainian People's Republic of Soviets (1917–1918) based in Kharkiv, and its Soviet successors. This force, along with the Ukrainian Republic (based in Kyiv), plus the White Movement, Poland, Green armies, and the Anarchists, fought constantly with each other, which resulted in many casualties among Ukrainians fighting in a 1917–21 Ukrainian Civil War as part of the wider Russian Civil War of 1917–23. The Russian SFSR would (after the 1921 Treaty of Riga) extend control over what would ultimately become the Ukrainian Soviet Socialist Republic and (in 1922) a founding member of the Soviet Union.

History

Revolutionary wave

On 10 June 1917, the Central Council of Ukraine declared its autonomy as part of the Russian Republic by its First Universal at the All-Ukrainian Military Congress. The highest governing body of the Ukrainian People's Republic became the General Secretariat headed by Volodymyr Vynnychenko. The Prime Minister of Russia Alexander Kerensky recognized the Secretariat, appointing it as the representative governing body of the Russian Provisional Government and limiting its powers to five governorates: Volyn, Kyiv, Podolia, Chernigov, and Poltava. At first Vynnychenko protested and left his post as Secretariat leader, but eventually returned to reassemble the Secretariat after the Tsentralna Rada accepted the Kerensky Instruktsiya and issued the Second Universal.

After the October Revolution the Kyivan faction of the Bolshevik Party instigated the uprising in Kyiv on 8 November 1917 in order to establish Soviet power in the city. Kyiv Military District forces attempted to stop it, but after the Tsentralna Rada threw its support behind the Bolsheviks, the Russian forces were eliminated from Kyiv. After expelling the government forces, the Rada announced a wider autonomy for the Ukrainian Republic, still maintaining ties to Russia, on 22 November 1917. The territory of the republic was proclaimed by the Third Universal 20 November 1917 (7 November by Old Style) of the Tsentralna Rada encompassing the governorates: Volyn, Kyiv, Podolie, Chernigov, Poltava, Kharkov, Yekaterinoslav, Kherson, Taurida (not including Crimea). It also stated that the people of the governorates: Voronezh, Kholm, and Kursk were welcome to join the republic through a referendum. Further the Tsentralna Rada in its Universal stated that because there was no Government in the Russian Republic after the October Revolution it proclaimed itself the Supreme governing body of the territory of Ukraine until order in the Russian republic could be restored. The Central Council of Ukraine called all revolutionary activities such as the October Revolution a civil war and expressed its hopes for the resolution of the chaos.

After a brief truce, the Bolsheviks realized that the Rada had no intention of supporting the Bolshevik Revolution. They re-organized into an All-Ukrainian Council of Soviets in December 1917 in an attempt to seize power. When that failed due to the Bolsheviks' relative lack of popularity in Kyiv, they moved to Kharkiv. The Bolsheviks of Ukraine declared the government of the Ukrainian People's Republic outlawed and proclaimed the Ukrainian People's Republic of Soviets with capital in Kyiv, claiming that the government of the People's Secretaries of Ukraine was the only government in the country. The Bolshevik Red Army entered Ukraine from the Russian SFSR in support of the local Soviet government. As the relationships between members within the Tsentralna Rada soured, a series of regional Soviet republics on the territory of Ukraine proclaimed their independence and allegiance to the Petrograd sovnarkom (Odessa Soviet Republic (southern Ukraine), Donetsk-Krivoi Rog Soviet Republic (eastern Ukraine)). The Donetsk-Kryvoi Rog Republic was created by a direct decree of Lenin as part of the Russian SFSR with its capital in Kharkiv. That decree was successfully implemented by Fyodor Sergeyev who became the chairman of the local government as well as joining the Soviet government of Ukraine, simultaneously. Unlike Fyodor Sergeyev's Republic, the Odessa Republic was not recognized by any other Bolshevik governments and on its own initiative had entered a military conflict with Romania for control over the Moldavian Democratic Republic, whose territory it was contesting.

Timeline
The following information is based on the exposition of the Museum of Soviet occupation in Kyiv (Memorial in Kyiv).

Spring 1917
 8–12 March – February Revolution in the Russian Empire, victory of the democratic forces
 17 March – establishment of the Ukrainian Central Council
 4 April – recreation of Prosvita, establishment of the Ukrainian Cooperative Committee, and the Temporary Military Council, liberation of the people of Galicia, particularly Andrey Sheptytsky
 9 April – Mykhailo Hrushevsky returns from exile to head the Ukrainian Central Council
 10 April – the Ukrainian Central Council supported the convocation of the Ukrainian National Congress
 11 April – establishment of the Ukrainian Military Society of Hetman Polubotok headed by Mykola Mikhnovsky, organization of the 1st Ukrainian Volunteer Regiment of Bohdan Khmelnytsky
 13 April – a big demonstration took place in Kyiv with over 100,000 people, establishment of the Ukrainian National Council in Petrograd
 2–4 May – the Ukrainian National Congress took place in Kyiv, involving about 900 delegates, the Congress confirmed the composition of the Ukrainian Central Council of 150 members headed by Mykhailo Hrushevsky
 17 May – the commander of the Southwestern Front General Brusilov permitted the organization of the Bohdan Khmelnytsky Regiment which drafted 3,574 volunteers
 18 – 1 May Ukrainian Military Congress took place in Kyiv attended by over 700 delegates. The Congress elected the Ukrainian General Military Committee of 18 members headed by Symon Petliura

Summer 1917
 10–15 June – the 1st All-Ukrainian Peasant Congress took place in Kyiv in which 2,200 delegates participated
 11 June – extraordinary congress of the council of Ukrainian Military Society of Doroshenko in Simferopol decided to create a separate Ukrainian Regiment
 18–24 June – ignoring the prohibition of the Russian Provisional Government, the 2nd Ukrainian Military Congress took place in Kyiv. The congress accepted the declaration of a detailed plan of Ukrainization of the Russian Army, leaving Symon Petlyura as the head of the Ukrainian General Military Committee. The congress showed its support to the Ukrainian Central Council. The council of Kharkiv Governorate recognized the Ukrainian Central Council as a government authority in Ukraine
 24 June – announcement of the 1st Universal (Declaration) of the Ukrainian Central Council at Sofiyivska Ploshcha (Sofia Square)
 28 June – the Ukrainian Central Council elects the General Secretariat of Ukraine as an authority of state power
 11 July – a delegation of the Russian Provisional Government (Kerenskyi, Tereshchenko, and Tsereteli) arrived in Kyiv
 14 July – the Ukrainian Central Council adopted that Petty Council consisting of 40 representatives from Ukrainian and 18 from national minorities
 16 July – the Petty Council adopted the 2nd Universal (Declaration) of the Ukrainian Central Council
 29 July – the Petty Council adopted the Statute of the Highest Government of Ukraine
 8 August – a terrorist attack took place at the railroad station "Post-Volynsky" (Kyiv) where the newly formed Bohdan Khmelnytsky Regiment was attacked by the Moscow cuirassiers and Don Cossacks
 17 August – the Russian Provisional Government issued a temporary instruction (Instruktsia) for the General Secretariat of Provisional Government in Ukraine where it recognized the competency of the General Secretariat over five Governorates (Gubernias): Kyiv, Volyn, Poltava, Chernihiv, and Podillia

Autumn 1917
 22 September – the Petty Council adopted the declaration about the Ukrainian Constituent Assembly. The representatives of national minorities in the Petty Council condemned the intentions of Ukraine to separate from Russia
 27 September – start of the State Democratic Convention in Petrograd
 13 October – by the petition of the Kyiv Court Chamber the Russian Provisional Government initiates investigation against the General Secretariat for the intention to convene the Ukrainian Constituent Assembly
 7 November – October Revolution in Petrograd. Petty Council created of the Regional Committee in Protection of Revolution in Ukraine. The committee announced the extension of its powers over the nine Ukrainian governorates
 8 November – the Ukrainian Central Council adopted a resolution which condemned the revolution. In protest, the Bolsheviks left the Regional Committee and the Ukrainian Central Council
 9 November – the commander of the Kyiv Military District General Kvetsinsky refused to recognize the Regional Committee which in turn was dissolved transferring all its powers to the General Secretariat
 11 November – arrested Bolsheviks of a revolutionary committee. The Ukrainian Central Council adopted a bill about elections to the Ukrainian Constituent Assembly handing to the Petty Council to finalize the law and conduct the elections
 14 November – the Ukrainian Central Council and the General Secretary are recognized as state authorities. The General Secretary of Military Affairs Symon Petliura subordinates the Kyiv militia (law enforcement) to the Ukrainian government
 20 November – after the announcement of the 3rd Universal (Declaration) the deputies of Russian Cadets V. Krupkov and Polish Kolo V. Rudnytsky surrendered their mandates of the Ukrainian Central Council
 21 November – the General Secretary of Military Affairs Symon Petliura appoints General Pavlo Skoropadsky a commander of the Right-bank Ukraine armed forces
 22 November – in the presence of the French, Italian, and Romanian diplomatic missions, the 3rd Universal (Declaration) was announced at Sofiyivska Ploshcha (Sofia Square)
 27 November – the Ukrainian Central Council adopted a resolution regarding the Kholm Governorate protesting its annexation by Poland
 30 November – General Secretariat announced that Sovnarkom is not a legal authority of Russia. The Petty Council adopted the Law "About the Ukrainian Constituent Assembly" where it was established its composition of 301 members:
 Kyiv Governorate – 45
 Volyn Governorate – 30
 Podillya Governorate – 30
 Yekaterinoslav Governorate – 36
 Poltava Governorate – 30
 Kherson Governorate – 34
 Kharkiv Governorate – 35
 Tavria Governorate – 9
 Chernihiv Governorate – 27
 Ostrohozh district – 15
(Each deputy represents 100,000 of population, a right of vote have citizens of 20 years and older; established the Central Election Commission to the Ukrainian Constituent Assembly)

Winter 1917–18

 14–15 December – the Petty Council adopted the Law about the General Court, the highest judicial institution of the Ukrainian People's Republic. International diplomatic missions transferred their offices from Mohyliv-Podilsky to Kyiv. The government of France on 18 December announced its intention to have a diplomatic relationship with Ukraine. England declared a similar intention
 19 – 1 December Congress of Soviets of Workers', Soldiers', and Peasants' deputies of Ukraine expressed its complete trust to the Ukrainian Central Council and General Secretariat and condemned the Ultimatum of Lenin-Trotsky
 22 December – the Petty Council adopted the Law on taxes and collections, with which all taxes and collections belonged to the State Treasury of Ukraine
 23 December – the General Secretariat determined the composition of the Ukrainian delegation to the peace talks in Brest-Litovsk
 25 December – the Peace Conference in Brest-Litovsk sent in a telegram for Ukraine to join the negotiations
 3 January – General Georges Tabouis was appointed the Commissar of French Republic to the Government of Ukrainian People's Republic
 6 January – start of the peace negotiations in Brest. The head of Ukrainian delegation Vsevolod Holubovych requests recognition of Ukraine as a sovereign state, adding of the Kholm Governorate, and conducting a plebiscite on the territory of Austria-Hungary where dominated the Ukrainian population to add that territory to Ukraine
 9 January – 171 delegates were elected to the Ukrainian Constituent Assembly
 10–12 January – the Central powers recognized the Ukrainian delegation at the talks in Brest as a separate and plenipotentiary to conduct negotiations on the behalf of Ukrainian People's Republic
 16 January – the Petty Council adopted the law about creation of the Ukrainian National Army and its composition based on a militia principle
 22 January – the Petty Council adopted the law about the National-Individual Autonomy. For the last text of the 4th Universal (Declaration) voted: "for" – 39 voices, "against" – 4 voices, "abstained" – 6
 29 January – Battle of Kruty
 9 February – the Brest peace treaty was signed with Germany, Austria-Hungary, Ottoman Empire, and Bulgaria
 10 February – Due to advance of the Russian Bolshevik forces the government of Ukraine was evacuated to Zhytomyr from Kyiv
 21 February – the Ukrainian delegation issued a declaration about reasons for the arrival of German forces in Ukraine
 27 February – the Ukrainian Central Council adopted the law about the introduction in Ukraine a new style of calendar according which a time moves 13 days ahead. The Petty Council adopted the law about the new monetary system. The monetary unit became hryvnia that had 8.712 units of pure gold. Adoption of the law about the coat of arms of the Ukrainian People's Republic – Trident (Tryzub)

Spring 1918
In April 1918 troops loyal to the Ukrainian People's Republic take control of several cities in the Donbas region.

 2 March – the Petty Council adopted the law about citizenship of Ukraine, the law about new administrative system. The Russian established gubernias were to be replaced by new administrative unit – zemlia (land)
 18 March – several perished student-veterans of Kruty were reburied in Kyiv
 11 April – 12 May 1918 was designated as the first convocation of the Ukrainian Constituent Assembly
 13 April – Adoption of the Ukrainian Central Council resolution condemning the annexation of Bessarabia by Romania
 23 April – an economic treaty is signed between Ukraine and Germany with Austria-Hungary
 25 April – Adoption of the law about the Central Economic Council of Ukraine
 29 April – Adopted a bill on the Constitution of Ukraine. The All-Ukrainian Agrarian Congress elects Pavlo Skoropadsky the Hetman of Ukraine

Independence

Due to the aggression from Soviet Russia, on 22 January 1918, the Tsentralna Rada issued its Fourth Universal (dated 22 January 1918), breaking ties with Bolshevik Russia and proclaiming a sovereign Ukrainian state. Less than a month later, on 9 February 1918, the Red Army seized Kyiv.

Besieged by the Bolsheviks and having lost much territory, the Rada was forced to seek foreign aid, and signed the Treaty of Brest-Litovsk on 9 February 1918 to obtain military help from the German and Austro-Hungarian Empires. Germany helped the Ukrainian Army force the Bolsheviks out of Ukraine. On 20 February 1918 the council of the Kuban People's Republic accepted the resolution for a federal union of Kuban with Ukraine as Bolshevik forces pushed towards Yekaterinodar. It was agreed to forward the resolution for ratification to the Ukrainian government.

After the treaty of Brest-Litovsk, Ukraine became a virtual protectorate of the German Empire which at that time seemed more favorable than being overrun by the Soviet forces that were spreading havoc in the country. Germany was anxious about losing the war and was trying to speed up the process of food extraction from Ukraine, so it decided to install its own administration in the person of Generalfeldmarschall von Eichhorn who replaced the Colonel General Alexander von Linsingen. On 6 April the commander of the Army group Kijew issued an order in which he explained his intentions to execute the conditions of the treaty. That, of course, conflicted with the laws of the Ukrainian government, which annulled his order. By April 1918 the German-Austrian Operation Faustschlag offensive had completely removed the Bolsheviks from Ukraine. The German/Austro-Hungarian victories in Ukraine were due to the apathy of the locals and the inferior fighting skills of Bolsheviks troops compared to their Austro-Hungarian and German counterparts.

The Germans arrested and disbanded the Tsentralna Rada on 29 April 1918 to stop the social reforms that were taking place and restarted the process of food supply transfer to Germany and Austria-Hungary. The German authorities also arrested the Ukrainian Prime Minister, Vsevolod Holubovych, on terrorist charges, and thus disbanded the Council of People's Ministers. Prior to this, the Rada had approved the Constitution of the Ukrainian People's Republic. Concurrently with all these events and a few days prior to the change of powers in the country on 24 April 1918 the government of Belarus confirmed the Belarusian Chamber of Commerce in Kyiv headed by Mitrofan Dovnar-Zapolsky on the initiative of the Belarusian secretary of finance Pyotr Krechevsky.

Hetmanate

After the coup, the Rada was replaced by the conservative government of Hetman Pavlo Skoropadsky, the Hetmanate, and the Ukrainian People's Republic by a "Ukrainian State" (Ukrayinska derzhava). Skoropadsky, a former officer of the Russian Empire, established a regime favoring large landowners and concentrating power at the top. The government had little support from Ukrainian activists, but unlike the socialist Rada, it was able to establish an effective administrative organization, established diplomatic ties with many countries, and concluded a peace treaty with Soviet Russia. In a few months, the Hetmanate also printed millions of Ukrainian language textbooks, established many Ukrainian schools, two universities, and the Ukrainian Academy of Sciences.

The Hetmanate government also supported the confiscation of previously-nationalized peasant lands by wealthy estate owners, often with the help of German troops. This led to unrest, the rise of a peasant partisan (guerrilla) movement, and a series of large-scale popular armed revolts. Negotiations were held to garner support from previous Rada members Petliura and Vynnychenko, but these activists worked to overthrow Skoropadsky. On 30 July, a Russian Left Socialist-Revolutionary, Boris Mikhailovich Donskoy, with help from the local USRP succeeded in assassinating von Eichhorn, blowing him up in downtown Kyiv at a broadlight.

Due to the impending loss of World War I by Germany and Austria-Hungary, Skoropadsky's sponsors, the Hetman formed a new cabinet of Russian Monarchists and committed to federation with a possible future non-Bolshevik Russia. In response, the Ukrainian socialists announced a new revolutionary government, the Directorate, on 14 November 1918.

Timeline

Spring 1918
 29 April – All-Ukrainian Agrarian Congress elects Pavlo Skoropadsky as the Hetman of Ukraine
 30 April – Mykola Vasylenko was appointed the Chairman of Council of Ministers and tasked with the formation of government
 7 May – the Council of Ministers confirmed its intentions to add Crimea to the Ukrainian State
 15 May – Signing of a treaty between governments of Ukraine from one side and Germany and Austria-Hungary from another to provide a loan in amount of 400 million karbovanets for acquiring the Ukrainian food
 18 May – the Council of Ministers adopted the law about a creation of the State Guard
 23 May – started peace negotiations between representatives of Ukraine and Russia
 28 May – to Kyiv arrived the plenipotentiary delegation of the Regional Council of Kuban headed by Mykola Ryabovol with proposition of unification of Kuban with Ukraine
 30 May – the Minister of Foreign Affairs Dmytro Doroshenko petitioned with a special letter to the Ambassador of Germany in Ukraine, baron Alfons Mumm von Schwarzenstein, to include Crimea to Ukraine

Summer 1918
 12 June – the Congress of Landowners and Agrarians of Tavria Governorate that took place in Simferopol supported the proposition to include Tavria to Ukraine
 20 June – the All-Ukrainian Church Council took place in Kyiv
 1 July – adopted the decision about a creation of the Ukrainian university in Kamianets-Podilsky
 2 July – adoption of the law about citizenship of the Ukrainian State
 8 July – creation of the State Senate of the Ukrainian State as the supreme judicial institution
 9 July – creation of the commission in development of project of the Ukrainian Academy of Sciences
 10 July – Kyiv Orthodox clergy lifted the anathema on Hetman Mazepa
 24 July – Ukraine and Germany ratified the Brest Peace Treaty, adoption of laws about the general military obligation, criminal responsibility for exceeding the maximum established prices and speculation, appointments to government service
 27 July – due to the anti-Ukrainian policies of the Crimean government of Sulkevich the Ukrainian State established an economical blockade of the peninsula
 1 August – adoption of laws about supreme government and political position of military servicemen
 2 August – adoption of the law about the creation of fund of the National Library of Ukrainian State
 6 August – the All-Ukrainian Church Council called for the autocephaly of the Ukrainian Church
 10 August – confirmed the statute of the Ukrainian State Bank and its base and reserve capitals
 17 August – adopted the law about a restriction on import of the Russian monetary units
 22 August – in Vienna Turkey and Ukraine exchanged documents that ratified the Brest Peace Treaty
 10 September – signing of an economic agreement between Ukraine, Germany, Austria-Hungary for the 1918–1919 fiscal years
 18 September – temporary stop of custom war with Crimea on the petition of the Sulkevich government

Autumn 1918 
 5 October – in Kyiv started negotiations between Ukraine and Crimea about the conditions of Crimea inclusion to Ukraine
 6 October – Kyiv State Ukrainian University is opened
 16 October – Hetman of Ukraine issued declaration on the revival of cossackdom
 17 October – adopted a declaration about organization of volunteer militia on upholding the order of law
 21 October – Hetman of Ukraine met with the extraordinary mission of the Kuban regional government headed by Colonel V. Tkachov
 6 November – the German authorities transferred the ships of the Black Sea fleet to the Ukrainian State
 13 November – the Soviets annulled the Brest Peace Treaty and refused to recognize the independence of the Ukrainian State
 13–16 November – signing of agreement about trade, consulate, and sea relationships, railway and financial treaties between the government of Ukraine and the extraordinary mission of the Kuban regional government
 14 November – anti-Hetman Uprising
 26 November – the Ukrainian Academy of Sciences is created chaired by Vladimir Vernadsky

Winter 1918
 5 December – signing of agreement of cooperation between Ukraine and Georgia
 14 December – Hetman of Ukraine surrender his powers and emigrated to Germany

Directorate

The Directorate gained massive popularity, and the support of some of Skoropadsky's military units including the Serdiuk Division. Their insurgent army encircled Kyiv on 21 November. After a three-week-long stalemate Skoropadsky abdicated in favor of the Council of Ministers who surrendered to the Revolutionary forces. On 19 December 1918, the Directorate took control of Kyiv.

The Bolsheviks invaded Ukraine from Kursk in late December 1918 where the new Ukrainian Soviet government was reestablished earlier in November of the same year. On 16 January 1919 Ukraine officially declared a war on Russia while the Russian Soviet government continued to deny all claims of invasion. On 22 January 1919, the Directorate was officially united with the West Ukrainian People's Republic, although the latter entity de facto maintained its own army and government. On 5 February, the Bolsheviks captured Kyiv.

Throughout 1919, Ukraine experienced chaos as the armies of the Ukrainian Republic, the Bolsheviks, the Whites, the foreign powers of the Entente, and Poland, as well as anarchist forces such as that of Nestor Makhno tried to prevail. The subsequent Kyiv Offensive, staged by the Polish army and allied Ukrainian forces, was unable to change the situation. On 10 November 1920, the Directorate lost the remainder of its territory to the Bolsheviks in Volhynia as it crossed into Poland to accept internment. In March 1921, the Peace of Riga sealed a shared control of the territory by Poland, the Russian SFSR, and the Ukrainian SSR.

As the result, the lands of Galicia (Halychyna) as well as a large part of the Volhynian territory were incorporated into Poland, while the areas to the east and south became part of Soviet Ukraine.

After its military and political defeat, the Directorate continued to maintain control over some of its military forces. Preempting a planned invasion by its rival Archduke Wilhelm of Austria, in October 1921 the Ukrainian National Republic's government-in-exile launched a series of guerrilla raids into central Ukraine that reached as far east as Kyiv Oblast. On 4 November, the Directorate's guerrillas captured Korosten and seized much military supplies. But on 17 November 1921, this force was surrounded by Bolshevik cavalry and destroyed.

Timeline

Winter 1918–19
 14 December – the Directorate of Ukraine received the state powers in Ukraine after the Hetman of Ukraine emigrated to Germany
 16 December – the Directorate renewed the law about National-Individual Autonomy
 19 December – the grand entry of Directorate to the capital of Ukraine. Military parade at Sofiyivska Ploshcha. Note of protest to the countries of Entente due to occupation of ports of the Southern Ukraine (Allied intervention in the Russian Civil War)
 26 December – Directorate published a basis of its economic-social policies and political system
 31 December – Directorate issued a note of protest to the Soviet Russia due to its invasion of Ukraine
 1 January – Directorate adopted the law about the Supreme body of the Ukrainian Autocephalous Orthodox Cathedral Church
 2 January – order of the Chief Otaman Symon Petlyura to exile all enemies of Ukraine
 3–4 January – repeated notes of protest to the Soviet Russia due to its intervention
 4 January – Directorate adopted the law about Ukrainian monetary unit, hryvnia
 8 January – the government of Ukraine adopted the Land Law, based on the principles of socialism
 16 January – declaration of war with Moscow due to no results of peace negotiations
 22 January – declaration of Unification between Ukraine and West Ukraine at Sofiyivska Ploshcha
 23 January – session of Labor Congress initiated by Directorate was opened in Kyiv. The congress attended over 400 delegates, out which 65 represented the West Ukraine. It expressed its trust in Directorate and adopted the law about the form of government in Ukraine
 2 February – due to the advance of Bolsheviks Directorate moved from Kyiv to Vinnytsia
 13 February – Directorate changed the composition of the Council of National Ministers
 17 February – Directorate petitioned to the governments of Entente and the US for help in fight with Bolsheviks
 27 February – Chief Otaman met with Entente Commission in Khodoriv

Spring 1919
 15 March – the delegation of West Ukraine headed by Yevhen Petrushevych met with Directory in Proskuriv to further discuss development of joint operations
 4 April – plenipotentiary representative of Ukraine at the Versailles Peace Conference H.Sydorenko expressed his protest to the Polish military attack onto the Ukrainian territory and its political and material support by Entente
 9 April – Directory adopted the declaration on resignation of the Ostapenko government and appointing the new composition of the Council of National Ministers headed by Borys Martos
 15 April – the government of Ukraine appointed General Oleksandr Osetsky as the Otaman of the Army
 29 April – Volodymyr Oskilko Affairs
 9 May – Symon Petlyura was elected the head of Directory in Radyvyliv
 20 May – the peace negotiations of the diplomatic mission of Ukraine with the command of the Polish Army of Haller in Lublin showed no results

Summer 1919
 12 June – the government of Finland reestablished its diplomatic relationships with Ukraine
 16 June – the Cardinal Secretary of State Pietro Gasparri informed the Chairman of Directorate S. Petliura on the approval of Count Mykhailo Tyshkevych as the Ambassador of Ukraine to the Holy See
 18 June – the delegation of Ukraine at the Versailles Peace Conference together with the representatives of Estonia, Latvia, Belarus, Georgia, Azerbaijan, Northern Caucasus expressed its protest against recognition of the Supreme Council of the Paris Peace conference the government of Admiral Kolchak as the Supreme government of Russia
 20–21 June – signing of a temporary agreement of Ukraine with Poland in Lviv and establishment of demarcation line (Delwig line)

Anti-Bolshevik and other uprisings
The following is the list of numerous uprisings that took place during the formation of the Ukrainian People's Republic. Some of them were in opposition to the Petlyura's government (such as the Oskilko's Affair), some were against the establishment of the Soviet regime, some took place to eliminate the Entente forces. According to Cheka documentation, in Ukraine took place 268 uprisings from 1917 through 1932, where in over 100 raions the mutinied peasants were killing chekists, communists, and prodotryads that were requisitioning food by force which more resembled expropriation.
 Makhnovshchina (Nestor Makhno)
 Otaman Grigoriev
 Otaman Oskilko Affair (Volodymyr Oskilko)
 Otaman Zelenyi Uprising
 Kholodnyi Yar (Cold Ravine)
 Otaman Kamenyuka
 Free Cossacks (Semen Hryzlo)
 Zazymia Uprising (Troyeshchyna) - Otaman Romashka and Otaman Anhel against Kyiv and Chernihiv Cheka and Bashkir Cavalry Brigade
 Anti-Red Army ambush near Uman in 1920

Exile 

The government of Ukrainian People's Republic operated in Warsaw, Paris, Weimar, Kissingen, Munich, and Philadelphia.

After the beginning of the World War II Taras Bulba-Borovets, with the support of the President of the Ukrainian People's Republic in exile Andrii Livytskyi, crossed the German-Soviet border and started organizing UPA military units subordinate to the UPR Government.

The 10th Emergency Session of the Ukrainian National Council recognized the state of Ukraine as the successor of the Ukrainian People's Republic in exile and agreed to transfer the powers and attributes of state power to the newly elected President of Ukraine in 1991.

International recognition

The Ukrainian People's Republic was recognized de jure in February 1918 by the Central Powers of World War I (Austria-Hungary, Germany, the Ottoman Empire and Bulgaria) and by Bolshevik Russia, the Baltic States (Estonia, Latvia and Lithuania), Georgia, Azerbaijan, Romania, Czechoslovakia, and the Holy See. De facto recognition was granted by Switzerland, Sweden, Denmark, and Persia. Partial de facto recognition was received from the Belarusian Democratic Republic (see Belarus–Ukraine relations).

Later in 1918 Russia chose to withdraw its recognition of independent Ukraine, representing the protocols of the Versailles Treaty as justification for its action. In 1920 Symon Petliura and Józef Piłsudski signed the Warsaw Treaty in which both countries established their borders along the Zbruch River. The states that previously recognized the Ukrainian People's Republic ceased any relationships with its Government-in-exile after they recognized the Soviet Government in Kyiv.

Important diplomatic missions and results
 Treaty of Brest-Litovsk, 9 February 1918 (Central Powers: ratification of Germany and Turkey)
 Preliminary peace treaty with the Soviet Russia, 12 June 1918 (renouncement of Brest-Litovsk treaty on 13 November 1918)
 Peace treaty with Don Republic, 8 August 1918
 Unification Act, 20 January 1919 (unification of two semi-recognized entities), Hutsul Republic (Eastern Zakarpattia) announced their will to join as well
 Loss of Kyiv to Soviets on 2 February 1919 and political crisis within the national government of Ukraine
 Resignation of Serhiy Ostapenko and his government due to failure on series of negotiations with representatives of Entente
 Participation at the Paris Peace Conference, 1919
 The Eastern Galician mandate of the Jules Cambon Commission was approved by the Entente leaders to hand it over the Poland, 21 November 1919
 Treaty of Warsaw (1920) (Poland)

Demographics
According to the latest census that was taken 1897, the republic was accounted for over 20 million population in seven former Russian guberniyas, plus three uyezds of the Taurida Governorate that were located on the mainland.

 National composition (thousands)
 Ukrainians – 14,931.5 (73%)
 Russians – 2,146.1 (11%)
 Jewish – 1,871.8 (9%)
 Germans – 451.3 (2%)
 Poles – 375.9 (2%)
 Belarusians – 208.5 (1%)
 Romanians – 185.7 (1%)
 Other – 1%

Administrative division

On 4 March 1918 the Ukrainian government accepted the law about the administrative-territorial division of Ukraine. The law stated that Ukraine is divided into 32 zemlia (land) which are administrated by their respective zemstvo. This law was not fully implemented as on 29 April 1918 there was the anti-socialist coup in Kyiv, after which Hetman Pavlo Skoropadsky reverted the reform back to the guberniya-type administration.

Armed forces

The headquarters of the republic's armed forces was called the General Bulawa and was considered to be located in Kyiv. Of course, due to constant intervention from the Petrograd sovnarkom and the German Empire the physical location of it was changing (Kamyanets-Podilsky, Bila Tserkva, others).

Main military formations (UPR)
 Sich Riflemen
 Ukrainian Sich Riflemen were a similar unit, however, that unit wasn't part of Ukrainian military
 Free Cossacks
The following three Zaporizhian infantry regiments and the 3 Haidamaka Regiment of the biggest Ukrainian military formation, the Zaporizhian Corps, later were reorganized into the 1 Zaporizhian Division.
 Zaporizhian Corps
 Ukrainian Steppe Division (Anti-Bolshevik revolutionary-military unit)
 Ukrainian Marines
 1 Riflemen-Cavalry Division (Gray-Coats)
 Blue-Coats
 Sloboda Ukraine Haidamaka Kosh
 3 Iron Riflemen Division
 Ukrainian People's Republic Air Fleet
Navy of the Ukrainian People's Republic

Main military formations (WUPR)
 Ukrainian Galician Army, was a military formation of the West Ukrainian People's Republic

Money and banking

In December 1918 a temporary law about the issue of state banknotes by the UPR was adopted. According to this law: "Bank-notes must be issued in karbovanets" (Ukrainian: Карбованець). Each karbovanets contains 17.424 parts of pure gold and is divided into two hrivnas (Ukrainian: Гривня) or 200 shahs (Ukrainian: Шаг).

There were numerous banks in the republic among the most popular ones were the Ukrainabank and the Soyuzbank that were created by Khrystofor Baranovsky, the leader of a cooperative movement.

Maps
Green indicates UPR-controlled territory, red indicates the Red Army control, light yellow for the White Army control, dark yellow for Germany, blue for Poland, and brown for Romania. Bold black line indicates the borders of modern Ukraine.

See also

 General Secretariat of Ukraine
 West Ukrainian People's Republic
 Ukraine after the Russian Revolution
 History of the Jews in Ukraine#Ukrainian People's Republic
 Ukrainian karbovanets – first Ukrainian official currency
 Belarusian People's Republic
 Universal (act)
 Orange Revolution
 February 2014 Euromaidan clashes
 2014 Russian military intervention in Ukraine
 2014 Crimean crisis
 Ukrainian Death Triangle
 Government of the Ukrainian People's Republic in exile

Notes

References

Sources

Further reading

External links 
 
 People's war 1917–1932 by Kyiv city organization "Memorial"
 UNIVERSAL of the Ukrainian Central Rada addressed to the Ukrainian people living in and outside of Ukraine.. Translationreport.

 
Modern history of Ukraine
Russian Revolution in Ukraine
Ukrainian independence movement
History of Ukraine (1795–1918)
History of Ukraine (1918–1991)
Post–Russian Empire states
1910s in Ukraine
1920s in Ukraine
States and territories established in 1917
States and territories established in 1918
States and territories disestablished in 1918
States and territories disestablished in 1920
States and territories disestablished in 1921
1917 establishments in Ukraine
1918 establishments in Ukraine
1918 disestablishments in Ukraine
1920 disestablishments in Ukraine
1921 disestablishments in Ukraine
Russia–Ukraine relations
Russian-speaking countries and territories
Former countries of the interwar period
Former socialist republics
Former countries